"Trouble at a Tavern", or "Trouble at an Inn" (Welsh: Trafferth mewn Tafarn), is a short poem by the 14th-century Welsh poet Dafydd ap Gwilym, in which the poet comically narrates the mishaps which prevent him from keeping a midnight assignation with a girl.  Dafydd is widely seen as the greatest of the Welsh poets, and this is one of his best-known poems.  It has been described as "glorious farce", "one of Dafydd ap Gwilym's funniest and most celebrated cywyddau", and "the most vivid of [his] poems of incident".

Synopsis

Arriving at a "choice city" the poet finds lodging at an inn, where he meets an attractive girl.  He wines and dines her, then arranges to meet her later that night.  When everyone is asleep he makes his move, but stumbles over a stool in the darkness, and in getting up knocks over a table from which a brass bowl falls.  The noise of all this, and of the dogs who have started barking, awakens three English tinkers called Hickin, Jenkin and Jack.  They raise the alarm, believing that some Welsh thief is after their belongings.  The ostler rouses the other guests, but the poet, hunted for on all hands, manages with the help of fervent prayer to reach his own bed undiscovered.  He ends by asking God's forgiveness.

Setting

Several allusions in the poem demonstrate Dafydd's close personal knowledge of tavern life and tavern drinks.  Since such taverns were especially common in the Norman settlements in Wales it may be that the poem is set in such a town.  It is widely conjectured that the town in the poem is Newborough, Anglesey, a borough established by the Crown to house the inhabitants of Llanfaes, who had been cleared from their village to facilitate the building of Beaumaris Castle.  Dafydd must certainly known Newborough, since he wrote a poem in its praise.

Style

"Trouble at a Tavern" is written in an jerky, excited, abrupt style, and is characterised by the use of interjections and sangiadau, or words introduced in unsyntactical places.  This technique is much used in the stricter Welsh metres and is well suited to a narrative poem full of incident, tending to point up the comic anarchy of the action.  The poem is full of innuendo, allowing more than one reading of its words.

Themes and influences

The theme of the poet's misadventures in love is a very common one in Dafydd's work.  As the novelist and scholar Gwyn Jones wrote:

No lover in any language, and certainly no poet, has confessed to missing the mark more often than Dafydd ap Gwilym.  Uncooperative husbands, quick-triggered alarms, crones and walls, strong locks, floods and fogs and bogs and dogs are for ever interposing themselves between him and golden-haired Morfudd, black-browed Dyddgu, or Gwen the infinitely fair.

"Trouble at a Tavern"'s similarity to other poems by Dafydd with this same theme has enabled modern editors to attribute the poem securely to him, in spite of the fact that it survives in no manuscript from earlier than the late 16th century. The poem's mockery also extends to the English interlopers in Wales, and at least one reader has complained of its racial prejudice on that account.  But the critic Tony Conran sees "Trouble at a Tavern" as being not just a comic romp but a poem shot through with multiple layers of irony, most notably in its hints that the Welsh hero is playing at being an Anglo-Norman lordling, and therefore getting a justified comeuppance.  He also sees the possibility in the poem's final pious words of an ironic irreverence towards God himself.  But perhaps it is simply a warning to impetuous young men not to be so foolish.

Dafydd may have derived the theme of sexual comedy from the fabliaux, rollicking tales in verse of a type which originated in France and spread across Europe, though he differs from them in making the poet himself the butt of the story.  In that case there would be little or no reason to suppose the poem autobiographical.  Alternatively, he could have been influenced in this respect by the works of Ovid, of Chaucer, or of the goliards.  It has also been argued that the poem was based on the form of medieval morality tale known as exemplum, or that it was intended as a parody of the chivalric romance in which the narrator's humiliation is a judgement on his uncourtly attitude to love.

English translations and paraphrases

 Bell, David, in   With the Middle Welsh original in parallel text.
   With the Middle Welsh original in parallel text.
   With the Middle Welsh original in parallel text.
 
 Rev. repr. in 
 
 
 
 
 
 
 
 
 Rev. repr. at 
 
 
 Rev. repr. in 
 
 Rev. repr. in   With the Middle Welsh original in parallel text.

Footnotes

References

External links
 Full text in Middle Welsh at Welsh Wikisource
 "Trafferth mewn Tafarn", arranged by Peter Greenhill and performed by Gwilym Morus
 The Kenneth Hurlstone Jackson translation
 A paraphrase by Giles Watson

14th-century poems
Fictional drinking establishments
Humorous poems
Poetry by Dafydd ap Gwilym